Robert D. Bean Jr. (born January 6, 1978 in Atlanta, Georgia, United States) is a former professional Canadian football cornerback. He was drafted by the Cincinnati Bengals in the fifth round of the 2000 NFL Draft. He played college football for the Mississippi State Bulldogs.

Bean has also been a member of the Jacksonville Jaguars, Los Angeles Avengers, B.C. Lions, San Jose SaberCats and Winnipeg Blue Bombers.

Early years

Bean attended Lakeside High School in Atlanta, Georgia and was a letterman in football track and basketball his entire high school career. In football, he was a four-year starter at wide receiver, cornerback and free safety.  To this date he holds the triple jump record from his senior year of 1996.

College career

Bean spent two seasons at Mississippi State University following a two-year stint at Georgia Military College. He played in 23 games for the Bulldogs. He earned All-SEC second-team honors in 1998 after registering five interceptions, two blocked kicks, nine passes defended and 33 defensive tackles. Bean started all 11 games at left cornerback in 1999. He finished the season with four blocked punts, 44 defensive tackles, including 31 solo tackles, one interception, 13 passes defended and a fumble recovery. He added a blocked field goal in the Peach Bowl.

Professional career

Cincinnati Bengals
Bean was drafted by the Cincinnati Bengals in the fifth round of the 2000 NFL Draft. In his rookie season, Bean played in 12 games, totaling 23 tackles and one interception.

He played in 15 games for the Bengals in 2001, getting 43 tackles.

Jacksonville Jaguars
Before the 2002 season, Bean was traded to the Jacksonville Jaguars.

During the season, Bean only registered two tackles. A restricted free agent after the season, Bean re-signed on March 7, 2003.

After not playing during the 2003 season, Bean was released on March 21, 2003.

First stint with Lions
Bean attended the British Columbia Lions training camp in 2004.

Los Angeles Avengers
After being released by the Lions, Bean signed with the Los Angeles Avengers.

Second stint with Lions
Bean signed with the British Columbia Lions a second time and spent time on their practice roster during the 2004 season.

San Jose SaberCats
Bean briefly played for the San Jose SaberCats in 2005.

Winnipeg Blue Bombers
On May 2, 2006, Bean signed with the Winnipeg Blue Bombers. In his first season in Winnipeg, Bean led the team in interceptions with four. He had 22 tackles and two more with the special teams unit.

In 2007, Bean missed six games due to injury. He got a career high 45 tackles.

References

External links
Winnipeg Blue Bombers bio
BC Lions bio
cflpa.com bio

1978 births
Living people
American players of Canadian football
American football cornerbacks
Canadian football defensive backs
Mississippi State Bulldogs football players
Cincinnati Bengals players
Jacksonville Jaguars players
Los Angeles Avengers players
BC Lions players
San Jose SaberCats players
Winnipeg Blue Bombers players